Thomas Knox (11 November 1905 – 27 November 1954) was an English footballer who made 211 appearances in the Football League in the 1930s playing as a goalkeeper for Darlington, Hartlepools United, Notts County, Crystal Palace and Carlisle United. He was on the books of Norwich City without playing for them in the League, had trials with Bolton Wanderers, Bradford City and Leeds United before making his league debut with Darlington, and played non-league football for clubs including Ushaw Moor Labour Party, Bearpark Welfare, West Stanley, Chilton Colliery Recreation, Durham City and Crook Town.

During the Second World War, he acted as trainer to the Blackhall Colliery Welfare team, and afterwards went into business in Blackhall while acting as a scout for Notts County. He later moved to Carlisle, where he died in November 1954.

References

1905 births
1954 deaths
People from Blackhall Colliery
Footballers from County Durham
English footballers
Association football goalkeepers
West Stanley F.C. players
Chilton Colliery Recreation F.C. players
Durham City A.F.C. players
Crook Town A.F.C. players
Darlington F.C. players
Hartlepool United F.C. players
Notts County F.C. players
Crystal Palace F.C. players
Norwich City F.C. players
Carlisle United F.C. players
English Football League players
Notts County F.C. non-playing staff
People from Ushaw Moor